Black Eyes is the third extended play by South Korean girl group T-ara. Its release was originally set for release on November 18, 2011, but was pushed forward one week to November 11 due to the overwhelming demand for the album's lead track, "Cry Cry".

A repackaged version of the EP (though called the fifth album), titled Funky Town, was released on January 3, 2012, with the song "Lovey-Dovey" serving as the lead track.

Background and release 
The group's agency CCM released a series of Jacket Photos for "Cry Cry" from their new mini album, "Black Eyes".

The group began promoting the song as well as the album, starting on M! Countdown on November 17 , 2011.

In 2015, T-ara released the Chinese version of the song "Cry Cry" to promote the game "World of Warships".

Music videos

Drama version 
On November 9, 2 days before the album's release, the group officially released the video clip of the song "Cry Cry" as a music movie. In the video, T-ara sheds the usual feminine image, replacing it with strong images and intense gunfight scenes. At the end of the story was the audio teaser of "Lovey Dovey". The video then climbed to #1 on the Korean video chart GOM TV, a video sharing site equivalent to YouTube in South Korea, just 30 minutes after its release.

The Drama Version of "Lovey Dovey" was a continuation of "Cry Cry" Drama Version that ended the story. The "Cry Cry"/"Lovey Dovey" short movie is considered one of the longest music videos in Kpop's history. It also cost over USD 1 Million / 1,2 Billion Korean Won becoming the most expensive Kpop music video of all time.

Other versions 
T-ara released several other versions of "Cry Cry" and "Lovey Dovey" including Dance, Zombie, Ballad, Tokyo version etc.

The audio track from "Cry Cry's" ballad version music video was included on Black Eyes along with the original ballad version of the song.

Commercial performance 
"Cry Cry" peaked at number 1 on both Gaon Weekly singles and Billboard Korea Hot 100 Singles. The song has sold 3,755,993 digital units in South Korea as of 2012.

"We Were In Love", a single from Funky Town reached number 1 on Gaon Weekly singles and sold nearly 2,670,00 digital copies by 2012.

"Lovey-Dovey" scored the number one position on the Gaon singles chart In 2012 becoming the album's third consecutive number 1 hit. The song has achieved digital sales of over 3.7 million in South Korea alone.

Other songs in the album peaked within Top 200 on both Gaon and Billboard Korea Hit 100.

Track listings

Funky Town

Charts

Black Eyes

Funky Town

Sales

Accolades

Awards and nominations

Lists

References

2011 EPs
2012 EPs
T-ara albums
Kakao M EPs
Korean-language EPs